Milk is a nutrient liquid produced by mammary glands of mammals.

Milk may also refer to:

Drinkable liquids

Produced by animals
Breast milk, milk produced by a human mammary gland
Buffalo milk, milk of a domestic water buffalo
Camel milk, milk produced by camels 
Cow milk, milk produced by cows
Donkey milk, milk produced by donkeys
Goat milk, milk produced by goats
Mare milk, milk produced by horses
Moose milk, milk produced by moose
Powdered milk, powder that is drinkable when mixed with water
Sheep milk, milk produced by sheep
Reindeer milk, produced by reindeer
Yak milk, milk of a domestic yak

Produced from plants
Almond milk, a milk-like beverage made from almonds 
Coconut milk, a milk-like substance derived from a coconut
Milk substitute
Oat milk, a milk-like substance made from from oats.
Plant milk, any of various milk substitutes made from plants
Rice milk, a milk-like beverage made from rice
Soy milk, a milk-like beverage made from soybeans

Produced from chemicals
Milk of magnesia, a suspension of magnesium hydroxide, used as an antacid and laxative

People
Milk (drag queen), stage name of Dan Donigan, an American drag artist and competitor on RuPaul's Drag Race
Milk, a Chinese pop artist and former member of the Taiwanese band Energy
Harvey Milk (1930–1978), American politician and gay rights activist
MILCK, American singer-songwriter

Arts, entertainment, and media

Fictional characters
 Milk (Dragon Ball) or Chi Chi, a character in Dragon Ball media
 Sunny Milk, a character in the Touhou Project series
 Milk family, several characters in The Boys franchise

Film and television
Milk (2008 Turkish film), a film by Turkish writer/director Semih Kaplanoğlu
Milk (2008 American film), a film about Harvey Milk
Milk (2017 film), a Canadian drama film
Milk (2021 film), a Russian comedy-drama film
"Milk" (How I Met Your Mother), a 2006 episode of the sitcom How I Met Your Mother

Music

Ensembles
Milk (band), an alternative band led by Jeff Tremaine
M.I.L.K, a K-Pop girl group
Milk Inc., a vocal trance band

Albums
 Milk (album), a 2010 album by Hawksley Workman
 Milk, a 2015 album by Better Off

Songs
"Milk" (Kings of Leon song)
"Milk" (Garbage song)
"Milk" (The 1975 song)
"Milk", a song by Brockhampton from Saturation
"Milk", a song by the K-pop girl group f(x) from Red Light
"Milk", a song by the Stormtroopers of Death from Speak English or Die

Computing and technology 
 Milk (programming language)
 Milk Inc., a company founded by Kevin Rose to work on mobile Web concepts
Milk Music, a former music streaming service available in the Samsung Electronics app store

See also

Milk River (disambiguation)
Crop milk, a secretion from the lining of the crop of parent birds that is regurgitated to young birds
 
 Milc (disambiguation)